The Ontario Liberal Party (OLP; , PLO) is a political party in the province of Ontario, Canada. The party has been led by interim leader John Fraser since August 2022.

The party espouses the principles of liberalism, and generally sits at the centre to centre-left of the political spectrum, with their rival the  Progressive Conservative Party positioned to the right and the New Democratic Party (who at times aligned itself with the Liberals during minority governments),  positioned to their left.

The party has strong informal ties to the Liberal Party of Canada, but the two parties are organizationally independent and have separate, though overlapping, memberships. The provincial party and the Ontario wing of the federal party were organizationally one entity until members voted to split in 1976.

The Liberals lost official party status in the 2018 Ontario provincial election having fallen to only 7 seats, the worst defeat of a governing party in Ontario history. Prior to the 2018 election, the party had won every election since the beginning of the 21st century and had governed the province for the previous 15 years. In the 2022 provincial election, the Liberals saw a modest increase in support, finishing second in popular vote, but only winning 8 seats.

History

Origins 
The Liberal Party of Ontario is descended from the Reform Party of Robert Baldwin and William Lyon Mackenzie, who argued for responsible government in the 1830s and 1840s against the conservative patrician rule of the Family Compact.

The modern Liberals were founded by George Brown, who sought to rebuild the Reform Party after its collapse in 1854. In 1857, Brown brought together the Reformers and the radical "Clear Grits" of southwestern Ontario to create a new party in Upper Canada with a platform of democratic reform and annexation of the north-west. The party adopted a position in favour of uniting Upper and Lower Canada into the United Province of Canada, a concept that eventually led to Canadian confederation.

Confederation 
After 1867, Edward Blake became leader of the Ontario Liberal Party.  The party sat in opposition to the Conservative government led by John Sandfield Macdonald.  Blake's Liberals defeated the Tories in 1871, but Blake left Queen's Park for Ottawa the next year, leaving the provincial Liberals in the hands of Oliver Mowat.  Mowat served as Premier of Ontario until 1896.

While the Tories became a narrow, sectarian Protestant party with a base in the Orange Order, the Liberals under Mowat attempted to bring together Catholics and Protestants, rural and urban interests under moderate, pragmatic leadership.

Decline and opposition
The Liberals were defeated in 1905 after over thirty years in power. The party had grown tired and arrogant in government and became increasingly cautious. As well, a growing anti-Catholic sectarian sentiment hurt the Liberals, particularly in Toronto where they were unable to win a seat from 1890 until 1916. The Liberals continued to decline after losing power, and, for a time, were eclipsed by the United Farmers of Ontario (UFO) when the Liberals were unable to attract the growing farmers' protest movement to its ranks.

Debates over the party's policy on liquor divided the membership, forced the resignation of at least one leader, Hartley Dewart, and drove away many reform-minded Liberals who supported the federal party under William Lyon Mackenzie King but found the provincial party too narrow and conservative to support. The party was so disorganized that it was led for seven years (and through two provincial elections) by an interim leader, W.E.N. Sinclair, as there was not enough money or a sufficient level of organization, and too many divisions within the party to hold a leadership convention. By 1930, the Liberals were reduced to a small, rural and prohibitionist rump with a base in south western Ontario.

Return to power under Mitch Hepburn
After a series of ineffective leaders, the Liberals turned to Mitchell Hepburn, an onion farmer, federal Member of Parliament and former member of the UFO.  Hepburn was able to build an electoral coalition with Liberal-Progressives and attract reformers and urban voters to the party.  The Liberal-Progressives had previously supported the UFO and the Progressive Party of Canada.  A "wet", Hepburn was able to end the divisions in the party around the issue of temperance which had reduced it to a narrow sect. The revitalized party was able to win votes from rural farmers, particularly in southwestern Ontario, urban Ontario, Catholics and francophones.  It also had the advantage of not being in power at the onset of the Great Depression.  With the economy in crisis, Ontarians looked for a new government, and Hepburn's populism was able to excite the province.

In government, Hepburn's Liberals warred with organized labour led by the Congress of Industrial Organizations, who were trying to unionize the auto-sector.  Later, he battled with the federal Liberal Party of Canada government of William Lyon Mackenzie King, which, Hepburn argued, was insufficiently supportive of the war effort.  The battle between Hepburn and King split the Ontario Liberal Party and led to Hepburn's ouster as leader.  It also contributed to the party's defeat in the 1943 election, which was followed by the party's long stint in opposition.  The Liberals declined to a right wing, rural rump.  The "Progressive Conservatives" under George Drew established a dynasty which was to rule Ontario for the next 42 years.

Opposition during the Post-War boom
Ontario politics in recent times have been dominated by the Progressive Conservatives, also known as the Tories.  The Liberals had formed the Government for only five years out of sixty years from 1943 to 2003.  For forty-two years, from 1943 to 1985, the province was governed by the Tories.  During this period, the Ontario Liberal Party was a rural, conservative rump with a southwestern Ontario base, and were often further to the right of the moderate Red Tory Conservative administrations. In 1964, the party changed their name from the "Ontario Liberal Association" to the "Liberal Party of Ontario".

In September 1964, the party elected Andy Thompson as its leader. While the leadership election garnered some attention, it looked like Thompson would have a hard time winning an election. The Liberals had held office only three times for 13 years since 1900 and the party caucus was not that much different from the time between 1959 and 1963. They failed to get a popular candidate, Charles Templeton, elected in a by-election. They also lost another riding to the PCs when Maurice Bélanger died in March 1964. Thompson would last only two years as leader before resigning due to stress-induced health problems.

Throughout the 1960s and 1970s, the Liberals were almost shut out of Metropolitan Toronto and other urban areas and, in 1975, fell to third place behind the Ontario New Democratic Party (NDP) under Stephen Lewis.  With the NDP in ascendancy in the late 1960s and 1970s, it appeared that the Liberals could disappear altogether.

The Liberals remained more popular than the Tories among Catholic and Francophone voters, due to the party's support for extending separate school funding to include Grades 11–13.  The Tories opposed this extension until 1985, when they suddenly reversed their position. This reversal angered traditional Conservative voters, and may have contributed to their defeat in the 1985 election.

The Peterson years

The Ontario Liberal Party first broke the Tories' hold on the province in 1985 under the leadership of David Peterson. Peterson modernized the party and made it appealing to urban voters and immigrants who had previously supported the cautious government of Tory Premiers John Robarts and William Davis.

Peterson was able to form a minority government from 1985 to 1987 due to an accord signed with the Ontario NDP. Under this accord, the NDP agreed not to trigger an election via a non-confidence vote in exchange for the Liberals implementing certain agreed upon policies and not calling an election for  the next two years.

Once the accord expired, an election was called and Peterson won a strong majority government with 95 seats, its most ever.

Peterson's government ruled in a time of economic plenty where occasional instances of fiscal imprudence were not much remarked on. Peterson was a close ally of Prime Minister Brian Mulroney on the Meech Lake Accord, but opposed Mulroney on the issue of free trade.

The majority Liberal government of 1987 to 1990 was less innovative than the previous minority government.  The Liberals' increasing conservatism caused many centre-left voters to look at the Ontario NDP and its leader Bob Rae, and consider the social-democratic NDP as an alternative to the Liberals.

The Liberals went into the 1990 election with apparently strong support in the public opinion polls. This support quickly evaporated, however.  On the campaign trail, the media reported that the Liberals were met by voters who were angry at going to the polls just three years into the government's mandate.  Another negative factor was Peterson's association with Mulroney and the failed Meech Lake Accord attempt at constitutional reform, about which the public felt strongly.  The campaign was also poorly run: a mid-campaign proposal to cut the provincial sales tax was a particularly bad blunder.  The party had also underestimated the impact of the Patti Starr fundraising scandal, as well as allegations surrounding the Liberal government's links with land developers.

In the 1990 election, the Liberals only finished five points behind the NDP in the popular vote.  However, the NDP took many seats from the Liberals in the Toronto suburbs.  The NDP promised a return to the activist form of government that had prevailed from 1985 to 1987, and its co-operation with the Liberals during that time made it appear more moderate and acceptable to swing voters in the Toronto area.  Due to the nature of the first-past-the-post system, the Liberals were decimated, falling from 95 seats to 36.  The 59-seat loss surpassed the 48-seat loss in 1943 that began the Tories' long rule over the province.  Peterson himself was heavily defeated in his own London-area riding by the NDP challenger.

Return to opposition

By the 1995 election, the NDP government had become very unpopular due to perceived mismanagement, a few scandals, and because of the severe downturn in the economy.  The Liberal Party was expected to replace the unpopular NDP, but it ran a poor campaign under leader Lyn McLeod, and was beaten by the Progressive Conservatives under Mike Harris.  Harris swept to power on a right-wing "Common Sense Revolution" platform. In 1996, the Ontario Liberals selected Dalton McGuinty as their leader in a free-wheeling convention. Starting in fourth place, McGuinty's fiscally prudent record and moderate demeanor made him the second choice of a convention polarized around the candidacy of former Toronto Food Bank head Gerard Kennedy.

In the 1999 election, the governing Conservatives were reelected on the basis of strong economic growth and a negative campaign tightly focused on portraying McGuinty as "not up to the job". A poor performance in the leader's debate and a weak overall campaign hamstrung the new leader, but he was able to rally his party in the final weeks of the campaign. The Ontario Liberals garnered 40% of the vote, at the time their second-highest total in 50 years.

McGuinty's second term as opposition leader was more successful than his first. With the Liberals consolidated as the primary opposition to Harris's Progressive Conservatives, McGuinty was able to present his party as the "government in waiting". He hired a more skilled group of advisors and drafted former cabinet minister Greg Sorbara as party president. McGuinty also rebuilt the party's fundraising operation, launching the Ontario Liberal Fund. He personally rebuilt the party's platform to one that emphasized lowering class sizes, hiring more nurses, increasing environmental protections and "holding the line" on taxes in the buildup to the 2003 election. McGuinty also made a serious effort to improve his debating skills, and received coaching from Democratic Party trainers in the United States.

"Choose Change" the McGuinty government

In the 2003 election, McGuinty led the Liberals to a majority government, winning 72 out of 103 seats. The PC government's record had already been marred by a number of prior events, including the death of Dudley George, the Walkerton water tragedy and the government's performance during the SARS outbreak.  The PC's election campaign relied on attack ads against McGuinty, while the McGuinty campaign kept a positive message throughout. The PCs' negative attacks on McGuinty backfired throughout the campaign.

The new government called the Legislature back in session in late 2003, and passed a series of bills relating to its election promises. The government brought in auto insurance reforms (including a price cap), fixed election dates, rolled-back a series of corporate and personal tax cuts which had been scheduled for 2004, passed legislation which enshrined publicly funded Medicare into provincial law, hired more meat and water inspectors, opened up the provincially owned electricity companies to Freedom of Information laws and enacted a ban on partisan government advertising.

The McGuinty government also benefited from a scandal involving the previous Progressive Conservative government's management of Ontario Power Generation and Hydro One, which broke in the winter of 2003–04. It was revealed that a number of key figures associated with Mike Harris's "Common Sense Revolution" had received lucrative, untendered multimillion-dollar consulting contracts from these institutions. Among the figures named in the scandal were Tom Long, former Harris campaign chairman, Leslie Noble, former Harris campaign manager and Paul Rhodes, former Harris communications director.

On May 18, 2004, Provincial Finance Minister Greg Sorbara released the McGuinty government's first budget. The centrepiece was a controversial new Health Premium of $300 to $900, staggered according to income. This violated a key Liberal campaign pledge not to raise taxes, and gave the government an early reputation for breaking promises. The Liberals defended the premium by pointing to the previous government's hidden deficit of $5.6 billion, and McGuinty claimed he needed to break his campaign pledge on taxation to fulfill his promises on other fronts.

The Ontario Health Premium also became a major issue in the early days of the 2004 federal election, called a week after the Ontario budget. Most believe that the controversy seriously hampered Liberal Prime Minister Paul Martin's bid for re-election.

Also controversial were the elimination of coverage for health services not covered by the Canada Health Act, including eye examinations and physical therapy. Other elements included a four-year plan to tackle the deficit left behind by the Progressive Conservatives, free immunization for children, investments in education and investments to lower waiting times for cancer care, cardiac care, joint replacement, MRI and CT scans.

Soon after the federal election, McGuinty hosted a federal-provincial summit on public health-care funding which resulted in a new agreement for a national health accord. This accord allowed the provincial Premiers and territorial leaders to draw more money from Ottawa for health services, and requires the federal government to take provincial concerns such as hospital waiting-lists into account. McGuinty's performance at the summit was generally applauded by the Canadian media.

The McGuinty government brought forward a number of regulatory initiatives in the fall of 2004. These included legislation allowing bring-your-own-wine in restaurants, banning junk food in public schools to promote healthier choices, outlawing smoking in public places and requiring students to stay in school until age 18. Following a series of high-profile maulings, the government also moved to ban pit bulls.

During early 2005, McGuinty called the Legislature back for a rare winter session to debate and pass several high-profile bills. The government legislated a Greenbelt around Toronto. The size of Prince Edward Island, the Greenbelt protects a broad swath of land from development and preserves forests and farmland. In response to court decisions, the Liberals updated the definition of marriage to include homosexual couples.

McGuinty also launched a PR campaign to narrow the politically charged $23 billion gap between what Ontario contributes to the federal government and what is returned to Ontario in services. This came as a sharp turn after more than a year of cooperating with the federal government, but McGuinty pointed to the special deals worked out by the federal government with Newfoundland and Labrador and Nova Scotia as compromising the nature of equalization payments. In particular, McGuinty noted that immigrants in Ontario receive $800 in support from the federal government, while those in Quebec receive $3800.

In the 2003 campaign, the Liberals denounced public-private partnerships (also known as "3P" deals) for infrastructure projects such as the building of hospitals.  Following the campaign, however, the McGuinty government allowed "3P" hospital construction deals arranged by the previous government to continue.

The Ontario Liberals won their second majority in a row on October 10, 2007, winning 71 of the province's 107 seats. Winning two majorities back to back is a feat that had not occurred for the party in 70 years.

In the next general election on October 6, 2011, McGuinty led the Liberals to win a historic third consecutive term and to once again form government, albeit with a minority of seats in the legislature.  The Liberals won 53 of the 107 seats, just short of a 54-seat majority government. On October 15, 2012, McGuinty announced that he would resign as leader and Premier. At the end of January 2013, the party elected MPP Kathleen Wynne as leader, making her the 25th Premier of Ontario.

Majority under Wynne 
The June 12, 2014 election was triggered by the Ontario New Democratic Party's decision to reject the 2014 Ontario Budget. The Liberal Party under the leadership of Kathleen Wynne won 58 seats in the Legislature, and formed a majority government.

In 2015 the Liberals proposed to sell 60 per cent of the province's $16-billion share of the province's electricity distribution utility, Hydro One.  Hydro One Brampton and Hydro One Networks' distribution arm would be spun off into a separate company and sold outright for up to $3 billion.

The government pivoted to the left in the lead up to the 2018 election by raising the minimum wage, introducing reforms to employment standards and labour law, bringing in a limited form of pharmacare and promising universal child care.

Loss of Official Party Status 

In the 2018 general election, the Liberals were swept from power in a historic defeat that resulted in large gains for both the Progressive Conservatives and NDP. The Liberal popular vote fell to 19%, almost half their previous result; the party lost 51 seats and were reduced to a rump of only seven seats in a swing that elected a PC majority and made the NDP the official opposition.

Notably, the Liberals lost all but three of their 18 seats in Toronto, were completely shut out in the 905 region and won only one seat outside of Toronto and Ottawa. The seven-member rump caucus was one short of the requirement to retain official status in the Ontario legislature, and was also the only remnant of Wynne's cabinet. Wynne herself barely held onto her own seat by 181 votes. Accepting responsibility for the worst showing in the party's 161-year history and the worst defeat of a sitting government in Ontario, Wynne resigned as Liberal leader on election night.

On June 14, 2018, John Fraser was appointed as interim leader of the party following a vote by caucus members, riding association presidents, and party executives.

In the 2018 municipal election later in the year, six of the defeated Liberal MPPs — Bill Mauro, Kathryn McGarry, Jim Bradley, Mike Colle, Granville Anderson and Dipika Damerla — were elected to municipal office as mayors, city councillors or regional councillors.

In March 2020, the party elected former Cabinet Minister Steven Del Duca as leader, who defeated five other candidates on the first ballot at the leadership convention.

In the 2022 general election, the Liberals gained only one seat once again falling short of official status by four seats. After failing to win in his own riding, leader Steven Del Duca announced his resignation as party leader.

Policies 
The Ontario Liberal Party is currently running on a centrist / center-left platform of expanding childcare spaces in the province, privatization of parts of Hydro One, building infrastructure projects, $30-billion investment into transportation across the province, allowing beer and wine to be sold in certain grocery stores, updating sex education in public schools, expanding the Ontario Health Insurance Plan (OHIP) in the form of OHIP+, and providing free tuition for qualifying post-secondary students.

Leaders

 Though Sinclair led the party through two elections, he was never formally elected as leader by the Ontario Liberal Association which, due to its state of disorganization, did not organize a leadership convention until 1930.

 Hepburn resigned as Premier in October 1942 after designating Gordon Daniel Conant as his successor, and Conant was sworn in as Premier. The Ontario Liberal Association (particularly supporters of William Lyon Mackenzie King) demanded a leadership convention and one was finally held in May 1943 electing Harry Nixon. Technically, Hepburn did not resign as Liberal leader until the convention.

 Nixon was elected interim leader by the caucus on November 16, 1966, and was acclaimed permanent leader at the January 1967 leadership convention.

 Nixon resigned as interim leader and MPP in order to accept a federal appointment.

 Elston resigned as interim leader when he entered the Liberal leadership race as a candidate.

 Fraser was unanimously interim leader by caucus and a vote of the party executive and riding association presidents following the defeat of the Wynne government in the 2018 provincial election.

Presidents
Past presidents of the party include Yasir Naqvi, Joe Cruden, and Jeffrey King., Pat Reid The current president is Kathryn McGarry.

Election results

1The Liberals were recognized as the Official Opposition following the 1923 election by the governing Conservatives, despite the fact that the United Farmers of Ontario had more seats.  According to historian Peter Oliver, this was an arbitrary decision without basis in precedent or law.  Conservative Premier G. Howard Ferguson used as justification an announcement by UFO general secretary James J. Morrison that the UFO would be withdrawing from party politics, though Oliver argues that this was facetious logic.  UFO parliamentary leader Manning Doherty protested the decision, but to no avail.  (source: Peter Oliver, G. Howard Ferguson: Ontario Tory, (Toronto: University of Toronto Press, 1977), p. 158.)

See also
 List of Ontario general elections
 List of Ontario Premiers
 List of political parties in Ontario
 Leader of the Opposition (Ontario)
 Liberal Party candidates, 2003 Ontario provincial election
 Liberal Party of Canada

References

External links
 Ontario Liberal Party

 
1857 establishments in Ontario
Liberal parties in Canada
Organizations based in Toronto
Political parties established in 1857
Populist parties
Provincial political parties in Ontario